The Naval Aircraft Modification Unit KDN Gorgon, originally designated TD2N, was an early jet-powered target drone developed by the Bureau of Aeronautics and constructed by the Naval Aircraft Modification Unit for use by the United States Navy. First flown near the end of World War II, it was cancelled due to problems with its engine in 1946.

Development
The TD2N-1 was a development of the Gorgon IIIB missile, designed in 1943 by the U.S. Navy Bureau of Aeronautics for use against heavy bomber aircraft and ground targets using optical guidance. The Gorgon IIIB was cancelled due to its engine proving unsatisfactory; however, a version simplified for use as a target drone was developed starting in November 1944. Built by the Navy's Naval Aircraft Modification Unit, located in the former Brewster Aeronautical Corporation factory in Johnsville, Pennsylvania, the TD2N-1 was of conventional design, with a monoplane wing and twin-tail configuration; to reduce cost and pressure on strategic materials, it was constructed primarily of wood with some portions of the fuselage being fabric-covered. The aircraft was powered by a Westinghouse 9.5 – later redesignated J32 – turbojet engine mounted beneath the airframe. The drone was controlled by a combination of preset navigation and radio command guidance, and was equipped with a parachute recovery system to allow the aircraft to be reused if it was not shot down.

Operational history
The first drop tests of the TD2N-1 took place in June 1945; on June 27, the first powered flight was attempted, but the aircraft crashed following  a failure of the radio command system. On August 17, the TD2N-1 completed its first successful powered flight. Testing at Naval Air Engineering Station Lakehurst continued following the end of World War II; in early 1946, the aircraft was redesignated KDN-1 as the Navy rationalized its designation system, however in March of that year the program was cancelled because of continuing development issues with the Westinghouse engine.

Surviving aircraft
One KDN-1 survives, having been donated by the United States Navy to the National Air and Space Museum in 1965; it remains in storage awaiting restoration.

Specifications

See also

References
Citations

Bibliography

KDN
1940s United States military utility aircraft
Unmanned aerial vehicles of the United States
Target drones
Single-engined jet aircraft
Twin-tail aircraft
High-wing aircraft
Aircraft first flown in 1945
World War II jet aircraft of the United States